John Christie (17 July 1925 – 2 January 2007) was a Scottish international lawn bowler.

Bowls career
Christie started bowling aged 18. In 1956 joined Northern Bowling Club. He won the championship eight times and made his international debut in 1965. He was capped 70 times.

His greatest moment came when winning the gold medal in the 1974 Pairs with Alex McIntosh at the 1974 British Commonwealth Games in Christchurch.

Christie was a Scottish international from 1965 to 1974.

Christie died in Leith on 2 January 2007, at the age of 81.

References 

1925 births
2007 deaths
Scottish male bowls players
Commonwealth Games medallists in lawn bowls
Commonwealth Games gold medallists for Scotland
Bowls players at the 1974 British Commonwealth Games
Medallists at the 1974 British Commonwealth Games